The 2012 Chicago Marathon was the 35th edition of the annual marathon race in Chicago, Illinois and was held on Sunday, October 7. An IAAF Gold Label Road Race, it was the fourth and final World Marathon Majors event to be held that year. Tsegaye Kebede won the men's race in a course record of 2:04:38 hours and Atsede Baysa was the women's winner in a personal best of 2:22:03. A total of 37455 runners finished the race (20688 men, 16767 women).

Summary
The focus of the women's race was Liliya Shobukhova, who had won the race three times consecutively but had dropped out of the Olympic marathon. Kenya's Lucy Wangui Kabuu was the second-fastest entrant with a best of 2:19:34 hours. Other prominent entrants included Ethiopians Atsede Baysa and Merima Mohammed. Tsegaye Kebede and Wesley Korir, runners-up in 2010 and 2011 respectively, were the principal contenders for the men's race.

Demonstrating the depth of the field, the men's race had thirteen runners in the pack by the halfway point (timing 1:02:54) – all of them Kenyan or Ethiopian. By the time the two pacemakers (Shadrack Kosgei and Merkabu Birke) had dropped out around the 30 km mark, Tsegaye had assumed the head of the pack. Laban Korir and Michael Kipyego had fallen away at that point. Tsegaye accelerated and a succession of four sub-4:40 miles reduced the lead pack to himself, Tilahun Regassa, Sammy Kitwara and Feyisa Lilesa. Wesley Korir was twenty seconds behind after 35 km. With one mile left, only Feyisa remained alongside Tsegaye, but the latter steadily pulled away in the final section of the race to win by a margin of fourteen seconds with a course record 2:04:38 hours. Feyisa took the runner-up spot and Tilahun completed the podium half a minute later. Kitwara and Wesley Korir were next to finish. Dathan Ritzenhein closed his race quickly to place ninth, the first non-East African to finish, with a personal record 2:07:47.

The women's race also had a number of contenders left as the race reached the half marathon mark in 1:11:15 hours, with two Russians, three Kenyans and four Ethiopians in the pack of nine. Kabuu seized the lead after this point and by 30 km she had divided the pack in two, with Fatuma Sado, Caroline Rotich and Rita Jeptoo all five seconds ahead of Atsede, Shobukhova and Werknesh Kidane. Merima Mohammed was the first prominent race drop-out. Over the next 5 km Fatuma faded away and Atsede had pushed her way back to the front. Rotich soon fell behind and the final mile stretch became a hotly contested duel between Atsede and Jeptoo. Atsede was the one to reach the line first by a very narrow margin – 2:22:03 to Jeptoo's 2:22:04. Kabuu took third while Shobukhova finished quickly for fourth place. Renee Metivier Baillie was the first American home in a personal record run of 2:27:17 for eighth.

The men's wheelchair race was won by Josh Cassidy and Tatyana McFadden defended her women's title.

Results

Elite men

Elite women

Wheelchair

Men

Women

See also

List of winners of the Chicago Marathon

References

Race results
2012 Chicago Marathon results. Chicago Marathon. Retrieved on 2013-02-02.

External links
Official website
Kebede wins Chicago Marathon in course-record 2:04:38

Chicago Marathon
2010s in Chicago
2012 in Illinois
Chicago Marathon
Chicago
October 2012 sports events in the United States
Mara